The Shivalya of Downtown Chicago (SDC) is the Hindu temple and cultural center in heart of downtown Chicago, Illinois.
Found and supported by humble devotees, SDC serves as a prayer and meditation center, for downtown Chicago dwellers.

 Deities adored at SDC are: Ganesh, Shiv-ling, Shiv and Parvati, Durga, Kartikey, Vishnu (Balaji) and Lakshmi, Sri Ram, Sita and Lakshman, Sri Hanuman, Sri Krishna and Radha, and Saraswasti
 Pran-pratishtha for Shiv Nagabharanam on March 10, 2013 at 9:30 AM.

Weekly events
Daily poojas start at 6:30 PM, followed by a Maha-arati around 7 PM.
 Monday: Shiv abhishek
 Tuesday: Hanuman Chalisa
 Wednesday: Group recitals
 Thursday: Sri Krishna bhajans
 Friday: Vishnu Sahasranam parayanam
 Weekends are packed with activities for both adults and children.
 Sponsored Lunch served on Sundays.

Major festivals and events
Shivalya celebrates all Hindu festivals including:

 Makar Sankranti/Pongal/Lohri: January
 Basant panchami: February
 Shiv-ratri: February or March
 Holi: February or March
 Ram-navami: April
 Hanuman Jayanti: April
 Akshay Tritiya: May
 Nag-panchami: August
 Raksha Bandhan: August
 Krishna Janmashtami: August
 Ganesh Chaturthi: September
 Nav-ratri/Dashera/Durga Pooja: Sept/October
 Karwa Chauth: October
 Deepavali/Diwali: Oct/November
 Vaikund-ekadashi: December

Special events
SDC recently celebrated pran-pratishtha of deities in 2012. 
 Upcoming celebrations include Janmashtami on August 28, 2013
 Upcoming 1 year anniversary celebration on September 29, 2013

Shivalya Cultural center
Shivalya aims to be a learning center for kids growing in the downtown. Various classes are conducted for kids of all ages on Saturdays and Sundays.

SDC cultural center welcomes new and seasoned learners.
 Yoga classes   
 Weekend School - Music, Arts, Religion and language
 Meditation Sessions

Facility
The temple has a prayer hall, auditorium and a library with audio and video facilities. Elevator in the building. Street and garage parking is available.

Temple hours are:
 Monday-Friday: 11AM - 8PM
 Saturday-Sunday:9AM - 7PM

Management and volunteers
SDC is managed by noble minded volunteers and bhaktas.

References

External links
 The Shivalya of Downtown Chicago Homepage

Hindu temples in Illinois
Tourist attractions in Chicago
Tourist attractions in Cook County, Illinois